The Mall of Tripla is a shopping mall in Keski-Pasila, Helsinki, Finland. The mall, along with a rebuilt railway station, opened on 17 October 2019.

In 2022 just after three years from completion The Mall of Tripla will undergo large scale renovation on the facades due construction errors and poor materials.

The Tripla complex

Mall of Tripla is part of the larger Tripla complex, which also encompasses the new Pasila railway station,  of office space, a Sokos hotel with more than 400 rooms opened in January 2020, a car park, and residential buildings for 1,000 residents. The cost of the Tripla complex was approximately 1.1 billion euros. The European Union provided €130 million of funding for Tripla due to the emphasis on environmental impact in planning the complex.

Companies transferring their headquarters to the Tripla complex include Telia Finland, St1, and HOK-Elanto (part of the S Group).

See also
 Pasila railway station

References

External links 

 

Shopping centres in Helsinki